Norddal is a former municipality in Møre og Romsdal county, Norway. It merged with Stordal municipality to establish the new Fjord municipality in 2020. It covered the easternmost part of the Sunnmøre region along the border with Oppland county. The municipal center of the municipality was the village of Sylte (also known as Valldal) in the Valldalen valley.

Norddal covered an area with several distinct valleys and villages: Eidsdal and Norddal (Dalsbygda) in the south; Tafjord in the east; and Fjørå/Selboskarbygda and Sylte in the Valldalen valley in the north. Norwegian County Road 63 traverses the municipality from south to north, going through several tunnels in the mountains including the Stordal Tunnel. The Heggur Tunnel connects the isolated village of Tafjord with the rest of the municipality.

At the time if its dissolution in 2020, the  municipality is the 116th largest by area out of the 422 municipalities in Norway. Norddal is the 345th most populous municipality in Norway with a population of 1,670.

General information
The prestegjeld of Norddal was established as a municipality on 1 January 1838 (see formannskapsdistrikt law). Historically, the district of Sunnylven was part of the parish of Norddal, but on 1 January 1838 when Norddal municipality was established, Sunnylven was established as its own municipality, separate from Norddal. The municipal borders have not changed since that time.

On 1 January 2020, the neighboring municipalities of Norddal and Stordal were merged into the new Fjord Municipality.

Name
The Old Norse form of the name was just Dalr, identical with the word dalr which means "valley" or "dale". The first element Nord- meaning "northern" was added around the year 1600. The parish church is still sometimes called Dale Church. Before 1918, the name was written Norddalen.

Coat of arms
The coat of arms was granted on 16 February 1990. The arms show a red twig of a strawberry plant on a yellow background. Norddal has a tradition for producing fruits such as apples, pears, and berries, notably strawberries.

Churches
The Church of Norway had one parish within the municipality of Norddal. It is part of the Austre Sunnmøre prosti (deanery) in the Diocese of Møre.

History
Valldal is mentioned in the historical books of Snorri Sturluson. While escaping the Danish army, Olav Haraldsson, later to become St. Olav, went ashore in Valldalen during the winter 1028/1029. Here, he supposedly came across a troublesome "sea serpent" which he tossed onto the mountainside and can today be seen as a lighter rock pattern above the town centre Sylte. On his journey up the valley towards Trollstigen, he received help from the farmers at Grønning to pass a rocky section called Skjærsura. For this help he deemed that the seed crop would never suffer from frost. Also, a natural spring in Valldal is named after St. Olav and is said to have a healing effect.

In 2008, a memorial stone was erected at the farm Døving, about  up the valley from the sea, where the first church and cemetery is believed to have been located.

Government

The municipal council of Norddal was made up of 17 representatives that were elected to four year terms. The party breakdown for the final municipal council was as follows:

Geography
The municipality lies around the Norddalsfjorden and the Tafjorden which flow west to east. They are the innermost branches off the main Storfjorden. Stranda Municipality lies to the west and south, Skjåk Municipality lies to the southeast, Rauma Municipality lies to the east and north, and Stordal Municipality lies to the northwest.

The main Valldalen valley runs to the northeast from the fjord. The valleys are surrounded by the Tafjordfjella mountain range. The mountains Puttegga, Karitinden, and Tordsnose sit on the eastern border of the municipality. The mountain Høgstolen lies in the northern part of the municipality. Reinheimen National Park is located partially in the municipality of Norddal.

See also
List of former municipalities of Norway

References

External links

Destinasjon Geirangerfjord - Trollstigen

Municipal fact sheet from Statistics Norway 

 
Fjord (municipality)
Former municipalities of Norway
1838 establishments in Norway
2020 disestablishments in Norway
Populated places disestablished in 2020